Gernail Singh is a 1987 Pakistani Punjabi language film, directed by Yunus Malik and produced by Fayyaz Khan. It stars Sultan Rahi, Anjuman, Mustafa Qureshi, Kaifee, Ghulam Mohiuddin, and Chakori.

Synopsis
Gernail Singh describes the conflicts between Hindus, Muslims and Sikhs in 1947 at the time of partition of British India . This film is based on a true story and events.

Production and release
Gernail Singh was released by Evernew Studio with film music by Wajahat Attre.

Cast
 Sultan Rahi – Gernail Singh
 Anjuman – (love interest of Gernail Singh)
 Mustafa Qureshi – Chandi Wala
 Ghulam Mohiuddin – Ghulam Mohammad
 Kaifee – (Husband of Banto)
 Chakori – (Banto)
 Nannha
 Bahar  – (mother of Ghulam Mohammad)
 Adeeb – Mr. Dahir
 Habib – Basheera
 Anwar Khan – Karnail Singh
 Durdana Rahman – Reeta
 Seema 
 Zahir Shah
 Nasrullah Butt
 Altaf Khan – Mainje
 Saleem Hasan
 Khawar Abbas
 Haidar Abbas
 Hairat Angez
 Afzal Khan

Track list
The music of the film is by Wajahat Attre. The film song lyrics are by Khawaja Pervez and singers are Noor Jehan and  Naheed Akhtar.

References

External links
 

Pakistani action films
Films set in the partition of India
1987 films
Punjabi-language Pakistani films
1980s Punjabi-language films
1987 action films